Malcolm is a ghost town in Bruce County, Ontario, located within the municipality of Brockton.

Communities in Bruce County
Ghost towns in Ontario